Karschiellidae is the sole family of earwigs in the superfamily Karschielloidea.See first entry in external links section for reference.</ref> Like the family Diplatyidae, Karschiellidae is a relatively small family with few members.

Genera and species
The family includes the following genera and species:

 Bormansia Verhoeff, 1902
 Bormansia aberrans Hincks, 1959
 Bormansia africana Verhoeff, 1902
 Bormansia discendens Hincks, 1959
 Bormansia impressicollis Verhoeff, 1902
 Bormansia meridionalis Burr, 1904
 Bormansia monardi Menozzi, 1937
 Bormansia proxima Hincks, 1959
 Bormansia pusilla Brindle, 1978
 Karschiella Verhoeff, 1902
 Karschiella buettneri (Karsch, 1886)
 Karschiella camerunensis Verhoeff, 1902
 Karschiella neavei Burr, 1909
 Karschiella pygmaea Rehn, 1933

References

External links
 The Earwig Research Centre's Karschiellidae database Source for references: type Karschiellidae in the "family" field and click "search".

Dermaptera families
Forficulina
Insects of Africa